Zobel Roxas Street is an east-west street that forms the southeastern limit of the City of Manila, the northwestern city limit of Makati, and the northern city limit of Pasay, all in Metro Manila, Philippines. It stretches across western Metro Manila from F. Muñoz Street in the Singalong area of Malate to Tejeron Street at the district boundary of San Andres Bukid and Santa Ana. It has a short extension northeast of the Tejeron Street–J.P. Rizal Avenue junction as Del Pan Street.

Zobel Roxas and other streets in the area (e.g., Alfonso, Consuelo, Enrique, Fernando, Jacobo, Don Pedro, C. Ayala and T. Ayala Streets) were named after members of the Róxas de Ayala and Zóbel de Ayala families, whose company, Ayala y Compañía, developed portions of Singalong and San Andres into residential areas in the 1930s. These areas formed part of the vast Hacienda San Pedro de Macati which José Bonifacio Róxas purchased in 1851 and later developed into commercial and residential areas.

Zobel Roxas was historically known as Casal Street.

Route description
Zobel Roxas begins at F. Muñoz Street at Manila's boundary with Pasay. It then meets Arellano Avenue, where it becomes a one-way street carrying northeastbound traffic, and other streets (except Arellano, Conchu and Dian) named after members of the Roxas de Ayala and Zobel de Ayala families. The northwestern side is part of San Andres, Manila while the southeastern side is part of Barangay Palanan, Makati. After its intersection with Osmeña Highway, the Makati part enters Barangays San Antonio and La Paz after the Agata-Kamagong-Ocampo Street intersection. It also becomes a two-way road from thereon. It traverses the boundary of San Andres and Barangay Singkamas. The street ends at the intersection of J. P. Rizal Avenue and Tejeron Street.

Landmarks
 Francisco Benitez Elementary School
 La Paz Elementary School
 Puregold Makati
 Rafael Palma Elementary School

References

Streets in Manila
San Andres, Manila
Santa Ana, Manila
Malate, Manila
Zobel de Ayala family